Cult Shaker, a product of CULT A/S, is a flavored alcohol beverage containing Guarana and cider (5.4% ABV). Unlike most "energy-mix" drinks the Cult Shaker is not mixed with vodka. This is because hard liquor is taxed higher in Denmark, where it is produced, than the hard cider actually used. However, the taste is comparable to the standard vodka mixes. It was launched in Denmark in 2003 and is currently available in Netherlands, Sweden, Norway, Germany and Hong Kong.  Cult Shaker was one of the first products to combine energy drinks with alcohol in a pre-mixed format.

Premixed alcoholic drinks
Energy drinks
Alcopops
Polysubstance alcoholic drinks